Vascular Health and Risk Management is a peer-reviewed medical journal covering research in cardiology. It is published by Dove Medical Press.

External links 
 

English-language journals
Open access journals
Dove Medical Press academic journals
Publications established in 2007
Cardiology journals